Baron Bicester, of Tusmore in the County of Oxford, is a title in the Peerage of the United Kingdom. It was created on 29 June 1938 for the banker Vivian Smith.  the title is held by his great-grandson, the fifth Baron, who succeeded his first cousin once removed in 2016.

The Barons Bicester are related to the  Barons Carrington. The first Baron Bicester's great-grandfather, John Smith MP (1767–1842), was the youngest brother of Robert Smith, 1st Baron Carrington. Also, John Smith's father, Abel Smith MP (1717–1788), had two elder brothers: George Smith (1714/15–1769), created a baronet in 1757 (see Bromley baronets), and John Smith (born 1716), the great-grandfather of Julian Pauncefote, 1st Baron Pauncefote.

Baron Bicester (1938)
Vivian Hugh Smith, 1st Baron Bicester (1867–1956)
Randal Hugh Vivian Smith, 2nd Baron Bicester (1898–1968), son of his predecessor
Angus Edward Vivian Smith, 3rd Baron Bicester (1932–2014), nephew of his predecessor
Hugh Charles Vivian Smith, 4th Baron Bicester (1934–2016), brother of his predecessor
Charles James Vivian Smith, 5th Baron Bicester (born 1963), first cousin once removed of his predecessor

The heir apparent is his son, Milo Louis Vivian Smith (born 2007).

Male-line family tree

See also
Baron Carrington
Bromley baronets
Bicester
Smith's Bank

Notes

References
Kidd, Charles, Williamson, David (editors). Debrett's Peerage and Baronetage (1990 edition). New York: St Martin's Press, 1990,

External links

Baronies in the Peerage of the United Kingdom
Noble titles created in 1938
Baron